Course of the Force, founded in 2012, is a partnership between Lucasfilm, Nerdist Industries, Machinima and Octagon (Sports Agency). The partnership's primary event is an Olympic-style lightsaber relay along the California coast.

History
The partnership and event are the brainchild of Peter Levin and Chris Hardwick, the operating heads of Nerdist Industries. The relay, held July 7–11, 2012 (the days leading up to the San Diego Comic Con), is a charity event to benefit the Make-A-Wish Foundation.  Nerdist Industries founder Chris Hardwick will host the event, with broadcasts on the Nerdist YouTube channel. Machinima has announced it will produce Course of the Force content for its network as well.

Participation
Running spots are available to the general public. The cost to sign up is $500. A limited edition Star Wars Ultimate FX lightsaber has been announced for the participants. Participants will travel from Santa Monica to San Diego in quarter-mile increments, handing off a lightsaber to the next runner.

Charity
100% of registration proceeds from Course of the Force benefit the Make-A-Wish Foundation chapters of Greater Los Angeles, Orange County and Inland Empire, and San Diego.

References

External links 

 
 Nerdist.com
 Machinima.com
 Lucasfilm.com
 Nerdist Channel
 DailyNews.com
 SDNews.com
 Huntington Beach News Press
 DailyNews.com
 Fox 5 San Diego

Charity fundraisers
Nerdist Industries